Elsa Beskow ( Maartman; 11February 187430June 1953) was a famous Swedish author and illustrator of children's books. Among her better known books are Tale of the Little Little Old Woman and Aunt Green, Aunt Brown and Aunt Lavender.

Background 
Born in Stockholm her parents were businessman Bernt Maartman (1841–1889), whose family came from Bergen, Norway, and Augusta Fahlstedt (1850–1915). Beskow studied Art Education at Konstfack, University College of Arts, Crafts and Design, then called Tekniska skolan, or the Technical school, in Stockholm.

She married former minister and social worker, doctor of theology Natanael Beskow in 1897. Elsa Beskow met her future husband at Djursholms samskola while serving as a teacher where he served as head master. From 1900 they lived in Villa Ekeliden in Djursholm which had initially been built for the author Viktor Rydberg. They had six sons, including the artist Bo Beskow (1906–1989) and geologist Gunnar Beskow (1901–1991).

Career 
In 1894 Beskow started to contribute to the children's magazine Jultomten. She ultimately began publishing her own books, doing both illustration and text. Overall, she would publish some forty books with her own text and images. 

Beskow frequently combined reality with elements from the fairy tale world. Children meet elves or goblins, and farm animals talk with people. Central themes were the relationships between children and adults and children's independent initiative. Her work "depicted a happy home atmosphere in the Swedish countryside of the late nineteenth and early twentieth centuries."

Beskow became one of the most well known of all Swedish children's book artists. Many of her books became classics and are continually reprinted. Beskow also illustrated ABC books and songbooks for Swedish schools. Her book pages are often framed by decorative framework of the Art Nouveau style.

Beskow received "international recognition for simple, cheerful stories and outstanding illustrations."

Poem

Legacy
The Elsa Beskow Award was created in 1958 to recognize the year's best Swedish picture book illustrator.

On 11 February 2013, Google celebrated Elsa Beskow's 139th Birthday with a doodle.

Selected works 

 Tale of the Little Little Old Woman, 1897
 Children from Solbacka, 1898
 Peter in Blueberry Land, 1901
 Olle's ski trip, 1907
 Children of the Forest, 1910
 Pelle's New Suit, 1912
 Flower Festival in the Hill, 1914
 George's book, 1916
 Aunt Green, Aunt Brown and Aunt Lavender, 1918
 Little Lasse in the garden, 1920
 Baby Brother's sailing journey, 1921
 Bubble Muck, 1921
 Grandma's quilt, 1922

 Christopher's harvest time, 1923
 Aunt Brown's Birthday, 1925
 Jan and all his friends, 1928
 Hat Cottage, 1930
 Grandma and-down Light, 1930
 Around the year, 1931
 The Sun Egg, 1932
 Woody, Hazel & Little Pip, 1939
 Talented Annika, 1941
 Uncle Blue's New Boat, 1942
 Peter and Lotta's Adventure, 1947
 Red bus, green car, 1952

References

Bibliography 
 Hammar, Stina  Elsa Beskow (1958)
 Håkansson, Gunvor Elsa Beskow och Astrid Lindgren (1967)'
 Sjögren, Margareta Elsa Beskow och hennes värld  (1983)

Further reading

External links 
 Elsa Beskow Biography at Floris Books, her English language publisher. English
 Site dedicated to Elsa Beskow.  Swedish
 Elsa Beskow (JulimJournals). German
 
 

1874 births
1953 deaths
20th-century Swedish women artists
20th-century Swedish artists
Artists from Stockholm
Swedish illustrators
Swedish-language writers
Swedish children's writers
Swedish children's book illustrators
Swedish women children's writers
Swedish women illustrators
Konstfack alumni
Art Nouveau illustrators
Swedish people of Norwegian descent
Members of Nya Idun